Sonia Lee (born April 12, 1960) is a Korean-born entrepreneur best known as the co-founder and president of Fullpower Technologies. Sonia Lee also co-founded LightSurf and Starfish Software.

Biography
She is married to Philippe Kahn, CEO of Fullpower Technologies and ran the business side of many of his businesses. They have one child. Together, they run an environmental charity, the Lee-Kahn Foundation. She is known for her passion for landscape and still life paintings.

The picture of her new born child was the first ever camera phone picture.

References

External links
Lee-Kahn Foundation, with biographies of Lee and Kahn

1960 births
Living people
Borland
21st-century American businesspeople
School of the Art Institute of Chicago alumni